Henry Ford Health (formerly the Henry Ford Health System) is an integrated, not-for-profit health care organization in Metro Detroit. The corporate office is at One Ford Place, in Midtown Detroit, Michigan. Henry Ford established the health system in 1915, and it is currently run by a 17-member board of trustees. Henry Ford Health also owns the health insurance company Health Alliance Plan.

On March 22, 2022, HFHS announced that they would be changing their name to "Henry Ford Health", dropping the word "system" from their name in order to put greater emphasis on the word "health" in their name.

Emergency rooms

The Henry Ford Health System operates nine emergency departments.

Medical centers
The Henry Ford Health System operates forty general medical centers and seven specialized medical facilities.

Hospitals
The Henry Ford Health System provides acute, specialty, primary and preventive care services backed by research and education.  Henry Ford's regional hospital and services include the below hospitals:

References

Henry Ford
Hospital networks in the United States
Medical and health organizations based in Michigan
Organizations based in Detroit
Organizations established in 1915